A list of films produced by the Ollywood film industry based in Bhubaneshwar and Cuttack in 1971:

A-Z

References

1971
Ollywood
Films, Ollywood
1970s in Orissa